Wendy Glenn is an English actress and model.

Career
Glenn started her career as a child model and attended the Sylvia Young Theatre School in London, which led to several national commercials and a guest star role on London's Burning. She presented The Disney Club, but left to play the lead in the British series Sister Said, in which she starred for three years.

After Sister Said, Glenn landed the role of Nikki Sullivan in Hollyoaks. She has appeared on the cover of Maxim and FHM, was a special guest star on Nip/Tuck, CSI: Miami, Without a Trace and CSI: Crime Scene Investigation, and portrayed the title role in the film Mercy.

Personal life
Glenn currently resides in Los Angeles, California. Her sister, Sammy Glenn, is also an actress.

Filmography

Film

Television

References

External links

English film actresses
English television actresses
Living people
1984 births
Actresses from Bristol
English female models
Child models